Men's Giant Slalom World Cup 1978/1979

Final point standings

In Men's Giant Slalom World Cup 1978/79 the best 5 results count. Nine racers had a point deduction, which are given in brackets. Ingemar Stenmark won the cup with maximum points by winning all 10 events. He won his fifth Giant Slalom World Cup in a row.

References
 fis-ski.com

World Cup
FIS Alpine Ski World Cup men's giant slalom discipline titles